Helen Merrill with Strings is the second album by Helen Merrill, featuring the singer fronting a quartet augmented by a string section arranged by Richard Hayman, recorded in 1955 and released on the EmArcy label.

Reception

The AllMusic review by Richard Mortifoglio called the album "an unmitigated artistic success. The strings are tastefully scored, the songs are classics or soon to be, and Merrill's delivery is by turns emotional, haunting, and highly musical."

Track listing
 "Lilac Wine" (James Shelton) - 4:26   
 "Anything Goes" (Cole Porter) - 3:07   
 "Mountain High, Valley Low" (Bernie Hanighen, Raymond Scott) - 3:02   
 "Beautiful Love" (Haven Gillespie, Egbert Van Alstyne, Victor Young, Wayne King) - 3:15   
 "Comes Love" (Charles Tobias, Sam H. Stept, Lew Brown) - 3:03   
 "End of a Love Affair" (E. C. Redding) - 3:29
 "When I Fall in Love" (Edward Heyman, Victor Young) - 3:22   
 "The Masquerade is Over" (Herb Magidson, Allie Wrubel) - 4:03   
 "Just You, Just Me" (Raymond Klages, Jesse Greer) - 3:35   
 "Spring Will Be a Little Late This Year" (Frank Loesser) - 3:51   
 "You Won't Forget Me" (Kermit Goell, Fred Spielman) - 3:10   
 "Wait Till You See Him" (Lorenz Hart, Richard Rodgers) - 3:22 
Recorded in New York on October 21 (tracks 1, 10 & 11), October 22 (tracks 3, 4, 6, 7 & 9) and October 24 (tracks 2, 5, 8 & 12), 1955

Personnel
Helen Merrill - vocals
Hank Jones - piano
Barry Galbraith - guitar
Milt Hinton - double bass
Sol Gubin - drums
Unidentified strings arranged and conducted by Richard Hayman

References

EmArcy Records albums
Helen Merrill albums
Albums arranged by Richard Hayman
1955 albums
Albums produced by Bob Shad